Kossmann or Koßmann is a German surname. Notable people with the surname include:

Alfred Kossmann (1922-1998), Dutch poet and prose writer
Ernst Kossmann (1922-2003), Dutch historian and twin brother of Alfred
Karl-Richard Koßmann (1896-1947), Generalmajor in the Wehrmacht during World War II
Kurt Kossmann (born 1971), American professional race car driver
Yvette Kosmann (born 1941), French mathematician and professor
Maarten Kossmann (born 1966), Dutch linguist and professor

See also
Kosman, a village in the municipality of Foča, Bosnia and Herzegovina
Kosman (surname)
Cossmann
Cosman

German-language surnames
Jewish surnames